José González Ganoza (10 July 1954 – 8 December 1987) was a Peruvian international footballer who played as a goalkeeper.

González Ganoza was among the victims of the 1987 Alianza Lima air disaster.

His nephew, Paolo Guerrero, is also a football player, who is the Peru national team's all time leading goalscorer.

References

External links

1954 births
1987 deaths
Peruvian footballers
Peru international footballers
Peruvian Primera División players
Club Alianza Lima footballers
1975 Copa América players
1982 FIFA World Cup players
1987 Copa América players
Association football goalkeepers
Victims of aviation accidents or incidents in Peru
Copa América-winning players
Footballers killed in the 1987 Alianza Lima plane crash